Althea McNish  (1924–2020) was an artist from Trinidad who became the first Black British textile designer to earn an international reputation.

Born in Trinidad, McNish moved to Britain in the 1950s. She was associated with the Caribbean Artists Movement (CAM) in the 1960s, participating in CAM's exhibitions and seminars and helping to promote Caribbean arts to a British public. Her work is represented in the collections of the Victoria and Albert Museum, the Whitworth Museum, the Philadelphia Museum of Art, the Museum of Domestic Design and Architecture and the Cooper-Hewitt (Smithsonian Design Museum), among other places.

McNish was a Fellow of the Chartered Society of Designers. She was married to the jewellery designer John Weiss (1933–2018).

Background

Early years 
Althea Marjorie McNish was born in Port of Spain, Trinidad, around 1933. Her father, the writer Joseph Claude McNish, was descended from the Merikin settlers in Trinidad. She painted as a child, helped with her mother's dressmaking business by doing sketches, was a junior member of the Trinidad Arts Society and had her first exhibition at the age of 16. Her influences included local artists Sybil Atteck, Amy Leong Pang and Boscoe Holder, and European modernists such as Vincent van Gogh.

Move to London 
In 1951 McNish moved with her mother to London, England, to join her father there. She already had a place to study at the Architectural Association School of Architecture in Bedford Square but instead took courses at the London School of Printing and Graphic Arts, the Central School of Arts and Crafts and the Royal College of Art. In her final year at the London School of Printing and Graphic Arts, she became interested in textiles with the encouragement of Eduardo Paolozzi, and chose printed textiles as her subject of study on progressing to the Royal College of Art, where her talent was recognised by Hugh Casson. 

On graduating, she immediately won a commission from Arthur Stewart-Liberty, head of the Liberty department store, sending her the same day by taxi to Zika Ascher, who commissioned her to design a collection for Dior. Successfully designing for such prestigious clients, McNish was the first Caribbean woman to achieve prominence in this field.

In 1966, McNish designed fabrics for the official wardrobe of Elizabeth II's during the Queen's visit to Trinidad.

She took part in the art exhibitions of the Caribbean Artists Movement (CAM) held in 1967, May 1968 and January 1971, exhibiting textiles as well as "plastic panels in laminate". For the Caribbean edition of the BBC TV magazine programme Full House, produced by John La Rose and transmitted on 3 February 1973, she brought together the work of CAM visual artists as a studio setting for CAM writers, musicians and film-makers.
More recently, her work — represented by three printed textiles from early in her career: Golden Harvest, Pomegranate and Fresco — was featured in the exhibition RCA Black: Past, Present & Future (31 August–6 September 2011), organised by the Royal College of Art in collaboration with the African and African-Caribbean Design Diaspora (AACDD) to celebrate art and design by African and African-Caribbean graduates.

Partnership with John Weiss 
In 1969 she married John Weiss, architect, jeweller and historian, and worked in partnership with him from 1971. They were in conversation with John La Rose on 2 February 1999 as part of the "Life Experience With Britain" series held at New Beacon Books (other participants included Dennis Bovell, Gus John, Rev. Wilfred Wood, Aggrey Burke, Yvonne Brewster, and Alexis Rennie). 

At the time of Weiss's death in 2018, Jake Leith, former president of the Chartered Society of Designers, said: "John and Althea were great ambassadors for the UK Fashion and Textile Design Sector."

McNish died in April 2020, at Spring Lane nursing home in Muswell Hill.

Notable designs
Most of McNish's designs are based on nature though some use abstract themes, occasionally geometric. One of her first designs to go into production, Golden Harvest in 1957, was a screen print on cotton satin, later manufactured by Hull Traders (for whom she also created eight other patterns), the design being based on an Essex wheatfield but using tropical colours. A number of her early designs including Tropic, a dress fabric printed on silk and produced by Zika Ascher in 1959, and  Gilia, a cotton furnishing fabric featuring tropical foliage in green and gold, produced by Hull Traders in 1961, are in the textile collection at the Victoria & Albert Museum. Also in 1959, for a commission by the Design Research Unit for the new SS Oriana, which was launched in November 1959 and was the last of the Orient Steam Navigation Company's ocean liners, she produced murals for two restaurants, Rayflower and Pineapples and pomegranates, laminated into Warerite plastic panels, a line later pursued by Perstorp Group. The 1960 modernisation of the interior of the Port of Spain General Hospital, Trinidad, by the architects Devereux and Davies, included murals by McNish.

In 1997, reviewing the exhibition Transforming the Crown: African, Asian and Caribbean Artists in Britain, 1966–1996, in which McNish participated at the Studio Museum in Harlem, New York, with other CAM artists, The New York Times reported that she "produces abstract, geometric fabric designs inspired by African motifs".

In 2018 McNish was named in Architectural Digest as one of "Five Female Designers Who Changed History" (alongside Maija Isola, Norma Merrick Sklarek, Muriel Cooper, and Denise Scott Brown).

McNish featured in the 2018 BBC Four documentary film Whoever Heard of a Black Artist? Britain's Hidden Art History, in which Brenda Emmanus followed Sonia Boyce and a team she led in preparing an exhibition at Manchester Art Gallery, focusing on artists of African and Asian descent who have played a part in shaping the history of British art.

Legacy 
In 2022, a major retrospective of her work, entitled Althea McNish: Colour is Mine, was mounted (2 April–11 September 2022) at the William Morris Gallery in Walthamstow, east London, sponsored by Liberty Fabrics. Co-curator Rosie Sinclair of Goldsmiths, University of London, observes: "Perhaps following this exhibition people will take another look at furnishings and fashion fabrics and wonder why colour became such an important part of new design taste in post-modern society and think about the individuals, a design pioneer such as Althea, who made this happen." Sinclair has also said: "She's a rare Black woman within international textile history. She broke boundaries." Coinciding with the exhbition, Liberty Fabrics reissued a capsule collection of McNish's original designs.

Selected exhibitions
Solo exhibitions
 1958: Althea McNish. Woodstock Gallery, London.
 1982: Althea McNish. People's Gallery, London.
 1997: Althea McNish. Hockney Gallery, Royal College of Art, London.
 2003: Althea McNish: My World of Colour: the international work and inspirations of a Black British Trinidadian textile designer. Ohio University, Athens, USA.
 2022: Althea McNish: Colour is Mine. William Morris Gallery, London.

Group exhibitions
 1961: Paintings by Trinidad and Tobago Artists. Commonwealth Institute, London.
 1967: Caribbean Artists Movement. Theatre Royal, Stratford.
 1968: Caribbean Artists Movement. Digby Stuart College, House of Commons of the United Kingdom and London School of Economics, London.
 1971: Caribbean Artists in England. Commonwealth Institute, London.
 1975: Caribbean Women Artists Exhibition. Olympia International Arts Centre, Kingston, Jamaica.
 1978: Afro-Caribbean Art. Artists Market, London, organised by Drum Arts Centre. 
 1978: The Way We Live Now. Victoria & Albert Museum, London.
 1981: INDIGO '81 International Exhibition. Indigo, Lille, France.
 1982: Commonwealth Festival Exhibition. Brisbane, Australia.
 1986: Make or Break. Henry Moore Gallery, London.
 1996: Caribbean Connection 2: Island Pulse. Islington Arts Factory, London.
 1997: Transforming the Crown: African, Asian & Caribbean Artists in Britain, 1966–1996. Caribbean Cultural Center, Studio Museum in Harlem, and Bronx Museum of the Arts, New York.
 1997: Trinidad and Tobago Through the Eye of the Artist: From Cazabon to the New Millennium 1813–2000. Commonwealth Institute, London. Exhibition in celebration of the 35th anniversary of independence of the Republic of Trinidad and Tobago.
 1998: Six into One: Artists from the Caribbean. Morley Gallery, London.
 2007: Trade and Empire: Remembering Slavery. Whitworth Art Gallery, University of Manchester, Manchester.
2011: RCA Black. Royal College of Art, London.
 2019: Get Up, Stand Up Now. Somerset House, London.

Awards and accolades
 1976: Chaconia Medal (Gold), Republic of Trinidad and Tobago, "for long and meritorious service to art and design"
 1988: Scarlet Ibis Award, Trinidad and Tobago High Commission, London
 2006: Honorary Doctor of Fine Art, University of Trinidad and Tobago
 2008: Journalist Angela Cobbinah described her as "immediately influential, helping to establish new furnishing trends as well as inspire more adventurous fashion designers further down the line like Zandra Rhodes."
 2012: Jubilee Gala Award for Achievement in the Arts at the UK High Commission of Trinidad and Tobago, celebrating the 50th anniversary of independence.

References

Further reading
 Roxy Harris and Sarah White (eds), Building Britannia: Life Experience With Britain: Dennis Bovell, Athea McNish, Gus John, Rev. Wilfred Wood, Aggrey Burke, Yvonne Brewster, Alexis Rennie, New Beacon Books, 2009, .
 Christine Checinska (2009), "Althea McNish and the British-African Diaspora", Chapter 3 in Anne Massey, Alex Seago (eds), Pop Art and Design, Bloomsbury Publishing, pp. 73–81.

 Christine Checinska (March 2018), "Christine Checinska in Conversation with Althea McNish and John Weiss", Textile, Volume 16, Issue 2: Aesthetics of Blackness? Cloth, Culture and the African Diasporas, 16:2, 186–199. DOI: 10.1080/14759756.2018.1432183.

External links
 
 "Althea Marjorie McNISH" at Debrett's People of Today.
 "Dr. Althea McNish in conversation with John Weiss". Stuart Hall Library, InIVA, 2015. "Audio recordings of Althea McNish in conversation with John Weiss", InIVA, 5 May 2015.
 "Designer Desire: Althea McNish", H is for Home Harbinger, 18 August 2018.
 Angela Cobbinah, "Althea: the original material girl", Camden New Journal, 20 June 2019.
 Libby Sellers, "Althea McNish", Maharam.
 Jess Johnson, "A Spotlight On… Althea McNish", Liberty, From the Archive.

1924 births
2020 deaths
20th-century British women artists
21st-century British women artists
Afro–Trinidadians and Tobagonians
Black British artists
British people of Trinidad and Tobago descent
British textile designers
Caribbean Artists Movement people
People from Port of Spain
Recipients of the Chaconia Medal
Trinidad and Tobago artists
Trinidad and Tobago emigrants to the United Kingdom
Trinidad and Tobago people of American descent
Trinidad and Tobago women artists